Clara Snell Wolfe  (1872–1970) was an American suffragist. She founded the Texas branch of the National Woman's Party and became its president.

Life
Wolfe née Snell was born on May 9, 1874 in Milledgeville, Illinois. In 1898 she graduated from Illinois State Normal University after which she became a school administrator and teacher, first working at an Illinois high school and then in the Illinois State Normal University system. In 1906 she married Albert Benedict Wolfe and the couple settled in Ohio.

In Ohio Wolfe attended Oberlin College where her husband worked as a teacher. She graduated in 1909, and continued her education at Ohio State University College and the University of California.

Wolfe was an active suffragist and clubwoman. She was a member of the Ohio Woman Suffrage Association where she served as the Recording Secretary from 1905 through 1909. She was also a member of the Ohio Federation of Women's Clubs, where she worked on the Ohio suffrage campaign of 1912.

Around 1914 the Wolfes moved to Austin, Texas. There Clara founded the Texas branch of the National Woman's Party (NWP) and became its president.

In 1923 the Wolfes moved back to Ohio. Clara remained active in the NWP, advocating for the Equal Rights Amendment. In 1942 she was elected as Second Vice Chairman of the NWP and in 1949 she was the Executive Council Vice Chairman.

Wolfe died on June 12, 1970 in Upper Arlington, Ohio.

See also
 List of suffragists and suffragettes

References

External links
 Timeline: Clara Snell Wolfe

1872 births
1970 deaths
Clubwomen
American suffragists
People from Carroll County, Illinois
Educators from Illinois
Illinois State University alumni
Oberlin College alumni
American women educators